Eric James Harrower (3 November 1907 – 28 February 1996) was an Australian rules footballer who played with South Melbourne in the Victorian Football League (VFL).

Notes

External links 

1907 births
1996 deaths
Australian rules footballers from Victoria (Australia)
Sydney Swans players